Linanthus filiformis (formerly Gilia filiformis) is a species of flowering plant in the phlox family known by the common name yellow gilia. It is native to the southwestern United States, where it grows in rocky desert and plateau habitat. This herb produces a threadlike, branching stem not more than about 15 centimeters long. It is generally hairless but may be thinly dotted with glands. The few linear leaves are up to 3 centimeters long and occur along the stem. The inflorescence generally bears one pair of yellow flowers, each flower under a centimeter wide.

External links
Jepson Manual Treatment
Photo gallery

filiformis
Flora of the Southwestern United States